Uthali (Bengliঃ উথলী)is a Union of Shivalaya upazila under Manikganj district- Dhaka Division, Bangladesh.

History 
Uthali Union is one of the modern Unions in Shivalaya upazila. It was established in 1918.

References

Unions of Shivalaya Upazila